Eric Baker may refer to:

 Eric Baker (activist) (1920–1976), British activist founder of Amnesty International
 Eric Baker (businessman) (born 1973), American businessman founder of Viagogo